The House at 6 S. Marble Street in Stoneham, Massachusetts, is a rare early 19th century worker's house, and the only significant survivor of the early quarrying industry in Stoneham.  It is a wood-frame house, two stories high, five bays wide and one room deep, with a side gable roof and a granite foundation.  It has simple cornerboards and door and window trim.  Houses like this were somewhat common on the early routes through the town, of which South Marble Street is a relatively undisturbed surviving fragment.  This house was built about 1810.

The house was listed on the National Register of Historic Places in 1984.

See also
National Register of Historic Places listings in Stoneham, Massachusetts
National Register of Historic Places listings in Middlesex County, Massachusetts

References

Houses on the National Register of Historic Places in Stoneham, Massachusetts
Houses in Stoneham, Massachusetts